Chah Suri (also Romanized as Chāh Sūrī) is a village in Golestan Rural District, in the Central District of Sirjan County, Kerman Province, Iran. At the 2006 census, its population was 22, in 4 families.

References 

Populated places in Sirjan County